This is a list of the world's best-selling albums of 2014. According to IFPI, the best-selling album of 2014 was 1989, selling 10.0 million copies worldwide. Both physical and digital album sales are included.

List of best-selling albums
 Soundtrack

See also

List of best-selling albums of 2013
List of best-selling albums
List of best-selling singles
List of best-selling albums by country
Lists of albums
List of best-selling albums of the 21st century

References

2014 in music